Remembering the Fireballs (Part 8) is a compilation album by the American post-hardcore group Lync.  It is composed of singles and unreleased tracks. The album was released on K Records in 1997.

Track listing

Personnel

Lync
 Sam Jayne – vocals, guitar
 James Bertram – bass guitar, vocals, mixing
 Dave Schneider – drums

Other musical personnel
Tim Green - moog synthesizer on "Can't Tie Yet"
John Atkins - guitar on "Can't Tie Yet"

Production
Pat Maley - recording (tracks 1-5), mixing
Tim Green - recording (tracks 6-12)
Phil Ek - recording (track 13)

References

1997 compilation albums
Lync albums
K Records compilation albums
Post-hardcore compilation albums